Bernadus Clinton Swartbooi (born 11 October 1977) is a Namibian politician.

Swartbooi was a Governor of the ǁKaras Region before being appointed as Namibia's deputy minister of lands and resettlement in 2015 by President Hage Geingob, a position he subsequently was forced to resign from in January 2017. On 27 July 2017, Swartbooi was removed from Parliament and resigned from SWAPO. In 2016 he formed the Landless People's Movement.

Swartbooi attended secondary school at Suiderlig Senior Secondary School in Keetmanshoop. While at studying at the University of Namibia, he served as the Secretary General for Namibia National Students Organisation and later its president.

Swartbooi worked as a prosecutor in Tsumeb and Khorixas and served as special assistant at the office of the Prime Minister. Swartbooi holds a Basic Education Teaching Diploma from Windhoek College of Education (now University of Namibia Khomasdal Campus) and B juris as well as Bachelor of Laws from the University of Namibia in 2001.

Landless People's Movement

In 2017, after being fired by president Hage Geingob from his ministerial position, Swartbooi formed the Landless People's Movement (LPM), a new political party with the aim to bring about change in the country through equitable land redistribution. LPM advocates for distribution of ancestral land to Namibians whose land was dispossessed by German settlers in the 1900s. He is the party's president and chief change campaigner.

In the 2019 Namibian general election, Swartbooi ran as presidential candidate of the LPM. They gathered 2.7% and four seats in Parliament.

References

Living people
People from ǁKaras Region
People from Hardap Region
Members of the National Assembly (Namibia)
SWAPO politicians
1977 births
Landless People's Movement (Namibia) politicians
University of Namibia alumni
Candidates for President of Namibia